"Shake Hands With Beef" is a song by the American rock band Primus. It was released on their 1997 release Brown Album. The song was also released as the first single from the album.

Music video
The video, directed by Les Claypool, features him, Larry LaLonde, and new drummer Bryan Mantia dressed in orange and brown playing atop a garbage can, while a family grills up a dinner of hamburgers in front of their trailer home. At certain points, Claypool and LaLonde grow insect wings and buzz around the barbecue, only to get swatted at by the family members, eventually flying into a bug zapper.

The video was recorded at a slower pace and sped up, making the band members appear to be making strange, jerky motions reminiscent of flies.

Other versions
The song was performed live for the first time with Bryan "Brain" Mantia on drums on Late Night with Conan O'Brien in 1997. An extended version of this song appears on Primus' "Best Of" album, They Can't All Be Zingers.

Reception
AllMusic writer Stephen Thomas Erlewine chose "Shake Hands with Beef" as one of the 3 highlights on the album, writing that the song "has a reasonably amusing adolescent lyric, but the real attraction of the song is how its thunderous bass riff weaves in and out with the syncopated drums and avant guitar".

References

Primus (band) songs
1997 songs
Songs written by Les Claypool
Songs written by Larry LaLonde
Interscope Records singles